Contamination is the presence of a constituent, impurity, or some other undesirable element that spoils, corrupts, infects, makes unfit, or makes inferior a material, physical body, natural environment, workplace, etc.

Types of contamination
Within the sciences, the word "contamination" can take on a variety of subtle differences in meaning, whether the contaminant is a solid or a liquid, as well as the variance of environment the contaminant is found to be in. A contaminant may even be more abstract, as in the case of an unwanted energy source that may interfere with a process. The following represent examples of different types of contamination based on these and other variances.

Chemical contamination
In chemistry, the term "contamination" usually describes a single constituent, but in specialized fields the term can also mean chemical mixtures, even up to the level of cellular materials. All chemicals contain some level of impurity. Contamination may be recognized or not and may become an issue if the impure chemical causes additional chemical reactions when mixed with other chemicals or mixtures. Chemical reactions resulting from the presence of an impurity may at times be beneficial, in which case the label "contaminant" may be replaced with "reactant" or "catalyst." (This may be true even in physical chemistry, where, for example, the introduction of an impurity in an intrinsic semiconductor positively increases conductivity.) If the additional reactions are detrimental, other terms are often applied such as "toxin", "poison", or pollutant, depending on the type of molecule involved. Chemical decontamination of substance can be achieved through decomposition, neutralization, and physical processes, though a clear understanding of the underlying chemistry is required. Contamination of pharmaceutics and therapeutics is notoriously dangerous and creates both perceptual and technical challenges.

Environmental contamination
In environmental chemistry, the term "contamination" is in some cases virtually equivalent to pollution, where the main interest is the harm done on a large scale to humans, organisms, or environments. An environmental contaminant may be chemical in nature, though it may also be a biological (pathogenic bacteria, virus, invasive species) or physical (energy) agent. Environmental monitoring is one mechanism available to scientists to detect contamination activities early before they become too detrimental.

Agricultural contamination

Another type of environmental contaminant can be found in the form of genetically modified organisms (GMOs), specifically when they come in contact with organic agriculture. This sort of contamination can result in the decertification of a farm. This sort of contamination can at times be difficult to control, necessitating mechanisms for compensating farmers where there has been contamination by GMOs. A Parliamentary Inquiry in Western Australia considered a range of options for compensating farmers whose farms had been contaminated by GMOs but ultimately settled on recommending no action.

Food, beverage, and pharmaceutical contamination

In food chemistry and medicinal chemistry, the term "contamination" is used to describe harmful intrusions, such as the presence of toxins or pathogens in food or pharmaceutical drugs.

Radioactive contamination
In environments where nuclear safety and radiation protection are required, radioactive contamination is a concern. Radioactive substances can appear on surfaces, or within solids, liquids, or gases (including the human body), where their presence is unintended or undesirable, and processes can give rise to their presence in such places. Several examples of radioactive contamination include:

 residual radioactive material remaining at a site after the completion of decommissioning of a site where there was a nuclear reactor, such as a power plant, experimental reactor, isotope reactor, or a nuclear powered ship or submarine
 ingested or absorbed radioactive material that contaminates a biological entity, whether unintentionally or intentionally (such as with radiopharmaceuticals
 escape of elements after nuclear accident, such as the contamination of Iodine-131 and Caesium-137 after the nuclear disaster in Chernobyl, Ukraine.

Note that the term "radioactive contamination" may have a connotation that is not intended. The term refers only to the presence of radioactivity, and gives no indication itself of the magnitude of the hazard involved. However, radioactivity can be measured as a quantity in a given location or on a surface, or on a unit area of a surface, such as a square meter or centimeter.

Like environmental monitoring, radiation monitoring can be employed to catch contamination-causing activities before much harm.

Interplanetary contamination
Interplanetary contamination occurs when a planetary body is biologically contaminated by a space probe or spacecraft, either deliberately or unintentionally. This can work both on arrival to the foreign planetary body and upon return to Earth.

Contaminated evidence

In forensic science, evidence can become contaminated. Contamination of fingerprints, hair, skin, or DNA—from first responders or from sources not related to the ongoing investigation, such as family members or friends of the victim who are not suspects—can lead to wrongful convictions, mistrials, or dismissal of evidence.

Contaminated samples

In the biological sciences, accidental introduction of "foreign" material can seriously distort the results of experiments where small samples are used. In cases where the contaminant is a living microorganism, it can often multiply to dominate the sample and render it useless, as in contaminated cell culture lines. A similar affect can be seen in geology, geochemistry, and archaeology, where even a few grains of a material can distort results of sophisticated experiments.

References

External links

Environmental science
Geochemistry
Quality control
Adulteration